Carlos Salvador Pablo Renato Estrada Santos (born 12 September 1997) is a Guatemalan footballer who plays as a defender for Al-Karkh.

Career

Estrada started his career with Guatemalan side Malacateco. In 2016, he signed for Comunicaciones in the Guatemalan top flight. In 2022, Estrada signed for Iraqi club Al-Karkh.

References

External links

 

1997 births
Al-Karkh SC players
Association football defenders
C.D. Malacateco players
Cobán Imperial players
Comunicaciones F.C. players
Expatriate footballers in Iraq
Guatemala international footballers
Guatemalan expatriate footballers
Guatemalan footballers
Iraqi Premier League players
Liga Nacional de Fútbol de Guatemala players
Living people